Kusur may refer to:
 Kusur, Republic of Dagestan
Kusur, Zaqatala, Azerbaijan
Kusur, Mawal, Pune, Maharashtra, India
Kusur, Vaibhavwadi, Sindhudurg, Maharashtra, India